Psychedelic film is a film genre characterized by the influence of psychedelia and the experiences of psychedelic drugs. Psychedelic films typically contain visual distortion and experimental narratives, often emphasizing psychedelic imagery. They might reference drugs directly, or merely present a distorted reality resembling the effects of psychedelic drugs. Their experimental narratives often purposefully try to distort the viewers' understanding of reality or normality.

Subgenres 
 The Acid Western was a style of Western popular in the 1960s and 1970s that use psychedelic imagery or allusions.
 The psychological drama is a drama subgenre with psychological elements that features psychedelic imagery in some films.
 The Stoner film is a comedy subgenre that revolves around the recreational use of cannabis.

Film examples 

 Un Chien Andalou, 1929 
 Fantasia, 1940
 Dumbo, 1941
 The Red Shoes, 1948 
 Alice in Wonderland, 1951
 Vertigo, 1958
 Looking for Toxin X, 1962
 X: The Man with the X-ray Eyes, 1963
 Mary Poppins, 1964
 Daisies, 1966 
 Fantastic Voyage, 1966
 The Mind-Benders: LSD and the Hallucinogens, 1967
 Point Blank, 1967 
 Casino Royale, 1967
Magical Mystery Tour (film), 1967
 Doctor Faustus, 1967
 2001: A Space Odyssey, 1968 
 Jigsaw , 1968
 Barbarella, 1968
 Curse of the Crimson Altar, 1968
 Project X, 1968
 Zeta One, 1969
 Case Study: LSD, 1969
 Savage Intruder, 1970
 Blood Mania, 1970
 The Dunwich Horror, 1970
 Zabriskie Point, 1970
 Performance, 1970 
 Willy Wonka & the Chocolate Factory, 1971
 Bedknobs and Broomsticks, 1971
 A Clockwork Orange, 1971
 The Devils, 1971 
 Behind the Green Door, 1972 
 Necromancy, 1972
 The Devil, 1972 
 Heavy Traffic, 1973
 Fantastic Planet, 1973 
 The Wicker Man, 1973 
 Zardoz, 1974
 Tommy, 1975
 Allegro Non Troppo, 1976
 The Man Who Fell to Earth, 1976
 3 Women, 1977 
 Hausu, 1977
 Suspiria, 1977 
 Nosferatu the Vampyre, 1979 
 Altered States, 1980
 Son of the White Mare, 1981 
 Pink Floyd – The Wall, 1982
 Dune, 1984
 Come and See, 1985 
 Night on the Galactic Railroad, 1985
 Natural Born Killers, 1994
 Dead Man, 1995 
 Fear and Loathing in Las Vegas, 1998
 Requiem for a Dream, 2000 
 Waking Life, 2001
  Paprika, 2006 
 Enter the Void, 2009
 Beyond the Black Rainbow, 2010 
 Generation P, 2011
 A Field in England, 2013 
 Under the Skin, 2013
 Upstream Color, 2013
 Doctor Strange, 2016
 The Love Witch, 2016
 Woodshock, 2017
 Annihilation, 2018
 Climax, 2018
 Mandy, 2018
 Midsommar, 2019
 Color Out of Space, 2019
 Lux Aeterna, 2019
 Friend of the World, 2020
 Last Night in Soho, 2021
 [[Churuli|Churuli]], 2021
 Everything Everywhere All at Once, 2022

Psychedelic counterculture era films include:

 Riot on Sunset Strip, 1967
 LSD Flesh of Devil, 1967
 The Love-Ins, 1967
 The Trip, 1967
 Magical Mystery Tour, 1967
 Something Weird, 1967
 The Acid Eaters, 1967
 Head, 1968
 Psych-Out, 1968
 The Girl on a Motorcycle, 1968
 Candy, 1968
 Revolution, 1968 
 Wonderwall, 1968
 Yellow Submarine, 1968
 Wild in the Streets, 1968
 I Love You, Alice B. Toklas, 1968
 Skidoo, 1968
 Here We Go Round the Mulberry Bush, 1968
 Les Idoles, 1968
 Easy Rider, 1969
 Angel, Angel, Down We Go, 1969
 The Big Cube, 1969
 Scream Free, 1969 
 Eggshells, 1969
 Zabriskie Point, 1970 
 Beyond the Valley of the Dolls, 1970
 Woodstock, 1970
 El Topo, 1970
 Toomorrow, 1970
 Gas-s-s-s, 1970
 200 Motels, 1971
 Fritz the Cat, 1972
 The Holy Mountain, 1973

 Television show examples 
 The Banana Splits Adventure Hour (1968–1970)
 H.R. Pufnstuf (1969–1970)
 Aeon Flux (1991–1995)
 The Ren and Stimpy Show (1991–1996)
 The Twisted Tales of Felix the Cat (1995–1997)
 Downtown (1999) 
 SpongeBob SquarePants (1999–present)
 Aqua Teen Hunger Force (2000–2015)
 The Mighty Boosh (2003–2007)
 12 oz. Mouse (2005–2006)
 Xavier: Renegade Angel (2007–2009)
 Superjail! (2007–2014)
 Tim and Eric Awesome Show, Great Job! (2007–2017)
 Adventure Time (2010–2018)
 Regular Show (2010–2017)
 The Amazing World of Gumball (2011–2019)
 Off the Air (2011–present)
 Uncle Grandpa (2013–2017)
 Rick and Morty (2013–present)
 Animals (2016–2018) 
 The Midnight Gospel (2020)
 Bee and PuppyCat (2022–present)
 Don't Hug Me I'm Scared'' (2022–present)

See also
 Stoner film
 Surrealist cinema
 Psychedelic art
 Psychedelic literature
 Psychedelic music
 List of films featuring hallucinogens

References

Lists of films
Film genres